Tricondyloides elongatus is a species of beetle in the family Cerambycidae. It was described by Stephan von Breuning in 1939.

It is 11 mm long and 2.5 mm wide, and its type locality is Plaine des Lacs, New Caledonia.

References

Parmenini
Beetles described in 1939
Taxa named by Stephan von Breuning (entomologist)